Marcello Beda (born 10 January 1995) is an Italian slalom canoeist who has competed at the international level since 2012.

He won a silver medal in the K1 event at the 2021 World Championships in Bratislava.

References

External links

Living people
Italian male canoeists
1995 births
Medalists at the ICF Canoe Slalom World Championships
21st-century Italian people